Margaret Yvonne Busby, Hon. FRSL (born 1944), also known as Nana Akua Ackon, is a Ghanaian-born publisher, editor, writer and broadcaster, resident in the UK. She was Britain's youngest and first black female book publisher when she and Clive Allison (1944–2011) co-founded the London-based publishing house Allison and Busby (A & B) in the 1960s. She edited the anthology Daughters of Africa (1992), and its 2019 follow-up New Daughters of Africa. She is a recipient of the Benson Medal from the Royal Society of Literature. In 2020 she was voted one of the "100 Great Black Britons". In 2021, she was honoured with the London Book Fair Lifetime Achievement Award.

Education and early years
Margaret Yvonne Busby was born in 1944, in Accra, Gold Coast (present-day Ghana), to Dr George Busby and Mrs Sarah Busby (née Christian), who both had family links to the Caribbean, particularly to Trinidad, Barbados and Dominica. Dr Busby (1899–1980) was a lifelong friend of Kwame Nkrumah's mentor George Padmore and attended school with C. L. R. James at Queen's Royal College, winning the Island Scholarship, which enabled him to travel to Britain in 1919 to study medicine. After initial studies at Edinburgh University, he transferred to University College, Dublin, to complete his medical qualifications, and then practised as a doctor in Walthamstow, East London (where there is a blue plaque in his honour), before relocating to settle in the Gold Coast in 1929. Through her maternal line, she is a cousin of BBC newscaster Moira Stuart, and her grandfather was George James Christian (1869–1940), a delegate at the First Pan-African Conference in London in 1900, who migrated to the Gold Coast in 1902.

Her parents sent their three children to be educated in England when Busby was five. She and her sister first attended a school in the Lake District, followed by Charters Towers School, an international girls' boarding-school in Bexhill-on-Sea, Sussex. After passing her O-levels there aged 14, Busby left school at 15, went back to Ghana and took her A-levels at 16, then spent a year at a college in Cambridge so as not to begin university too young. From the age of 17 she studied English at Bedford College (later merged with Royal Holloway College), London University, where she edited her college literary magazine as well as publishing her own poetry, and graduated with a BA Honours degree at the age of 20. She was married to British jazz musician and educator Lionel Grigson (1942–1994).

Publishing
While still at university she met her future business partner Clive Allison at a party in Bayswater Road, and they decided to start a publishing company. After graduating, Busby briefly worked at the Cresset Press – part of the Barrie Group – while setting up Allison and Busby (A & B), whose first books were published in 1967, making her the then youngest publisher as well as the first African woman book publisher in the UK – an achievement she has assessed by saying: "[I]t is easy enough to be the first, we can each try something and be the first woman or the first African woman to do X, Y or Z. But, if it's something worthwhile you don't want to be the only. ...I hope that I can, in any way, inspire someone to do what I have done but learn from my mistakes and do better than I have done."

She was Allison & Busby's Editorial Director for 20 years, publishing many notable authors including Sam Greenlee (author of The Spook Who Sat by the Door, the first novel published by A & B, in 1969), C. L. R. James, Buchi Emecheta, Chester Himes, George Lamming, Roy Heath, Ishmael Reed, John Edgar Wideman, Nuruddin Farah, Rosa Guy, Val Wilmer, Colin MacInnes, H. Rap Brown, Julius Lester, Geoffrey Grigson, Edward Blishen, Dermot Healy, Adrian Mitchell, Matthew Sweeney,  Jill Murphy, Christine Qunta, Michael Horovitz, Alexandra Kollontai, Gordon Williams, Carlos Moore, Michèle Roberts, Molefe Pheto, Arthur Maimane, Maurice Nyagumbo, Giles Gordon, Claire Rayner, Clive Sinclair, Mineke Schipper, Chris Searle, Richard Stark, James Ellroy, Hunter S. Thompson, Margaret Thomson Davis, B. Traven, Alexis Lykiard, Tom Mallin, Jack Trevor Story, Michael Moorcock, Mervyn Peake, John Clute, Julian Savarin, Ralph de Boissière, Andrew Salkey, Harriet E. Wilson, and Miyamoto Musashi.

Busby was subsequently editorial director of Earthscan (publishing titles by Han Suyin, Frantz Fanon, Albert Memmi, René Dumont, Carolina Maria de Jesus, and others), before pursuing a freelance career as an editor, writer, and critic.

Writing, editing and broadcasting
As a journalist, she has written for The Guardian (mainly book reviews or obituaries of artists and activists including Jessica Huntley, Buzz Johnson, Jayne Cortez, Jan Carew, Rosa Guy, Gwendolyn Brooks, June Jordan, Toni Cade Bambara, Florynce Kennedy, Barry Reckord, Frank Crichlow, Connie Mark, Glenn Thompson, August Wilson, Pearl Connor-Mogotsi, Geraldine Connor, Binyavanga Wainaina, bell hooks and Biyi Bandele), The Observer, The Independent, The Sunday Times, the New Statesman, and elsewhere, for both the general press and specialist journals.

Daughters of Africa (1992) and New Daughters of Africa (2019)
Busby compiled Daughters of Africa: An International Anthology of Words and Writings by Women of African Descent from the Ancient Egyptian to the Present (London: Cape, 1992), described by Black Enterprise as "a landmark", which includes contributions in a range of genres by more than 200 women. Widely reviewed on publication, it is now characterised as containing work by "the matriarchs of African literature. They pioneered 'African' writing, in which they were not simply writing stories about their families, communities and countries, but they were also writing themselves into the African literary history and African historiography. They claimed space for women storytellers in the written form, and in some sense reclaimed the woman's role as the creator and carrier of many African societies' narratives, considering that the traditional storytelling session was a women's domain."

Busby edited a 2019 follow-up volume entitled New Daughters of Africa: An International Anthology of Writing by Women of African Descent (first published by Myriad Editions in the UK), featuring another 200-plus writers from across the African diaspora. A reviewer in The Irish Times commented: "Sometimes you need an anthology to remind you of the variety, strength and nuance of writing among a certain region or group of people. New Daughters of Africa is indispensable because African voices have been silenced or diminished throughout history, and women's voices even more so."

Connected with the 2019 anthology, the "Margaret Busby New Daughters of Africa Award" was announced by the publisher, in partnership with SOAS, University of London, that will benefit an African woman student, covering tuition fees and accommodation at International Students House, London. The first recipient of the award was Kenyan student Idza Luhumyo, who began her course in autumn 2020, and went on to win the 2022 Caine Prize for African Writing.

Other book work
Busby has contributed to books including Colours of a New Day: Writing for South Africa (eds Sarah LeFanu and Stephen Hayward, 1990), Mothers: Reflections by Daughters (ed. Joanna Goldsworthy, 1995), IC3: The Penguin Book of New Black Writing in Britain (eds Kadija Sesay and Courttia Newland, 2000), Why 2K? Anthology for a New Era (2000), The Legacy of Efua Sutherland (2007), Essays in Honour of Ama Ata Aidoo at 70 (2012), 99 words (ed. Liz Gray, 2011), Black British Perspectives: A Series of Conversations on Black Art Forms (ed. Kadija Sesay, 2011), If I Could Tell You Just One Thing...: Encounters with Remarkable People and Their Most Valuable Advice (by Richard Reed, 2016), Slay in Your Lane: The Black Girl Bible (by Elizabeth Uviebinené and Yomi Adegoke, 2018), and Chris Fite-Wassilak's The Artist in Time (July 2020).

In 2014, Busby co-authored with Ishmahil Blagrove Carnival: A Photographic and Testimonial History of the Notting Hill Carnival. Among other books for which she has written introductions or forewords are the Penguin Modern Classics edition of A Question of Power by Bessie Head, Emerging Perspectives on Buchi Emecheta (ed. Marie Umeh, 1996), Beyond Words: South African Poetics (with Keorapetse Kgositsile, Don Mattera, Lebo Mashile and Phillippa Yaa de Villiers, 2009), and To Sweeten Bitter (2017) by Raymond Antrobus. With Darcus Howe, Busby co-edited C.L.R. James's 80th Birthday Lectures (Race Today Publications, 1984), and she is co-editor with Beverley Mason FRSA of No Colour Bar: Black British Art in Action 1960–1990, a 2018 publication arising out of the 2015–16 exhibition No Colour Bar held at the Guildhall Art Gallery.

Busby was a prominent participant in the major 2019 exhibition Get Up, Stand Up Now: Generations of Black Creative Pioneers at Somerset House, and contributed an introductory essay for the catalogue, as well as participating in events there.

Broadcasting and dramatisations
Busby has regularly worked for radio and television since the late 1960s, when she presented the magazine programme London Line for the Central Office of Information, as well as Break For Women on the BBC African Service, and later Talking Africa on Spectrum Radio, in addition to appearing on a range of programmes including Kaleidoscope, Front Row, Open Book, Woman's Hour, and Democracy Now! (USA).

Her abridgements and dramatisations for BBC Radio include books by C. L. R. James, Jean Rhys,<ref>"Jean Rhys – Wide Sargasso Sea", Radio Listings.</ref> Wole Soyinka, Timothy Mo, Sam Selvon, Walter Mosley, Henry Louis Gates, Lawrence Scott and Simi Bedford. Busby's play based on C. L. R. James's novel Minty Alley, and produced by Pam Fraser Solomon, was first broadcast on BBC Radio 4 in 1998,Nigel Deacon, "BBC Radio Plays, radio 4, 1998". Diversity Website. winning a Commission for Racial Equality "Race in the Media Award" (RIMA) in 1999.Barry Hodge, "Radio Drama & Readings, radio 4, 1999" – The Afternoon Play. June 2012. She was also part of Penumbra Productions, an independent production company, with other members including Horace Ové, H. O. Nazareth, Farrukh Dhondy, Mustapha Matura, Michael Abbensetts and Lindsay Barrett, among whose projects was a series of films based on lectures by C. L. R. James in the 1980s.Margaret Busby, "2015: The Year of Being Connected, Exhibition-wise", Wasafiri, Volume 31, Issue 4, November 2016.

Her writing for the stage includes Sankofa (1999), Yaa Asantewaa – Warrior Queen (UK/Ghana, 2001–02),Osei Boateng, "Yaa Asantewaa on stage: The Exploits of Yaa Asantewaa, the Warrior Queen of the Asantes...", New African, 1 April 2001. The Free Library.Cameron Duodu, "Yaa Asantewaa – warrior queen. (The Arts)", New African, 1 June 2001. The Free Library. directed by Geraldine Connor,"Yaa Asantewaa: Warrior Queen", Black Plays Archive, National Theatre. and An African Cargo (Greenwich Theatre, 2007) directed by Felix Cross for Nitrobeat.Felix Cross, "Belle: An Unexpected Journey" , Nitro, 13 June 2014."AFRICAN CARGO Greenwich Theatre, London. 2007", Felix Cross MBE. She has also been a song lyricist.John Stevenson, "Margaret Busby: Doyenne of Black British Publishing", Black History Month 365, 28 September 2016."Birthday Wishes and Greetings for Norma Winstone at 80", London Jazz News, 23 September 2021.

In 2014, following the death of Maya Angelou, Busby scripted a major tribute entitled Maya Angelou: A Celebration, which took place on 5 October at the Royal Festival Hall during the Southbank Centre's London Literature Festival; directed by Paulette Randall, and chaired by Jon Snow and Moira Stuart, the celebration featured contributions from artists including Adjoa Andoh, Angel Coulby, Chiwetel Ejiofor, Nicola Hughes, Ella Odedina, NITROvox, Roderick Williams and Ayanna Witter-Johnson.Lloyd Lewis Hayter, "Maya Angelou – A Celebration, Southbank Centre – review", Afridiziak Theatre News, 7 October 2014.

In June 2021, Busby appeared on BBC Radio 4's Desert Island Discs."Pioneering publisher Margaret Busby says industry still needs more diversity", The Irish Times, 26 June 2021.

Literary activism
She has worked continuously for diversity within the publishing industry, writing in a 1984 article in the New Statesman: "Is it enough to respond to a demand for books reflecting the presence of 'ethnic minorities' while perpetuating a system which does not actively encourage their involvement at all levels? The reality is that the appearance and circulation of books supposedly produced with these communities in mind is usually dependent on what the dominant white (male) community, which controls schools, libraries, bookshops and publishing houses, will permit." In the 1980s, she was a founding member of the organization Greater Access to Publishing (GAP),Busby, "'Is it still a case of plus ça change?, The Bookseller, 4 November 2016. which engaged in campaigns for increased Black representation in British publishing."How do we stop UK publishing being so posh and white?", The Guardian, 11 December 2015. Other members of this multi-racial group, which held a conference in November 1987 particularly to highlight publishing as an option for Black women, included Lennie Goodings, Maggie Scott, Ros de Lanerolle, Yvonne Collymore, Paula Kahn, Toks Williams, Kothai Christie, and Jacqui Roach.

Busby was the patron of Independent Black Publishers (IBP), a trade association chaired by Verna Wilkins.Tricia Wombell, "Books and Spoken Word Interview: Meet Margaret Busby", Lime. The aim of IBP, as Busby was quoted as saying, was to "provide a forum for progressive black publishers to share initiatives, maximise mutual strengths and identify common difficulties, with a view to having a more effective impact on the book trade and the wider publishing industry", and in 2007 at the London Book Fair a joint IBP stand showcased the books of Bogle-L'Ouverture Press, Tamarind Books, the X Press, Ayebia Clarke Publishing, Joan Anim-Addo's Mango Press, and other ventures. In a 2012 interview with Tricia Wombell, Busby said: "It is important to document and celebrate the achievements of many of our Black creatives (…) so that they do not get written out of history simply because their importance may not be recognised by the mainstream."

Busby has been a participant in numerous literary festivals and conferences internationally – in 1993, she gave the opening address at the International Book Fair of Radical Black and Third World Books – and has interviewed and been "in conversation" with such writers as Toni Morrison, Wole Soyinka, Nawal El Saadawi,"On Being A Woman Writer: Nawal El Saadawi in conversation", Africa Writes, 2 July 2016. Ngugi wa Thiong'o. and Ben Okri.

Busby was appointed chair of the 2020 Booker Prize judges, other members of the panel including Lee Child, Sameer Rahim, Lemn Sissay, and Emily Wilson.Otosirieze Obi-Young, "Margaret Busby Is Chair of Judges for 2020 Booker Prize for Fiction", Brittle Paper, January 2020. Busby has previously judged several other literary competitions, among them the Caine Prize for African Writing, the Orange Prize, the Independent Foreign Fiction Prize, the Wasafiri New Writing Prize, the OCM Bocas Prize for Caribbean Literature, the Commonwealth Book Prize (for which she was chair of the judges in 2012, when the winner was Shehan Karunatilaka), the Hay Festival initiative Africa39, and the Wole Soyinka Prize for Literature in Africa (chair of judges, 2018).Ninsiima Julian, "Uganda's Harriet Anena wins Wole Soyinka Prize for Literature in Africa 2018", PML Daily, 10 December 2018. In 2021, she served as a judge in the Trade category of the British Book Awards, and in 2022 judged the PEN Pinter Prize alongside Ruth Borthwick and Daniel Hahn.

She has served on the boards or in advisory positions for other cultural organisations, including the Drum Arts Centre, The Africa Centre, London, English PEN, the Royal Literary Fund, the African & Caribbean Music Circuit, the Hackney Empire theatre, the Organization of Women Writers of Africa, the Etisalat Prize for Literature, and Wasafiri magazine. She is currently a trustee of jazz education organization Tomorrow's Warriors,About | The Team", Tomorrow's Warriors. and of Nubian Jak Community Trust, and Prize Ambassador of the SI Leeds Literary Prize. She is a patron of Friends of the Huntley Archives at London Metropolitan Archives (FHALMA), a charitable foundation building on the archival legacy of Jessica Huntley and Eric Huntley, co-founders of the publishing house Bogle-L'Ouverture Publications.

In August 2022, Busby headlined the Berlin African Book Festival (curated by Lidudumalingani Mqombothi with the theme "Yesterday. Today. Tomorrow"), delivering the keynote address.

Influence and recognition
In 2018, in celebration of the 100th anniversary of women's right to vote, The Voice newspaper listed Margaret Busby – alongside Kathleen Wrasama, Olive Morris, Connie Mark, Fanny Eaton, Diane Abbott, Lilian Bader, and Mary Seacole – among eight Black women who have contributed to the development of Britain. Bustle magazine included Busby with Mary Prince, Claudia Jones, Evelyn Dove, Olive Morris, Olivette Otele, and Shirley Thompson on a list of "7 Black British Women Throughout History That Deserve To Be Household Names In 2019". Busby was also named by the Evening Standard on a list of 14 "Inspirational black British women throughout history" (alongside Mary Seacole, Claudia Jones, Adelaide Hall, Olive Morris, Joan Armatrading, Tessa Sanderson, Doreen Lawrence, Maggie Aderin-Pocock, Sharon White, Malorie Blackman, Diane Abbott, Zadie Smith and Connie Mark).

Also in 2018, she was among 150 "Leading Women" celebrated by the University of London to mark the 150 years since women gained access to higher education in the UK in 1868, and featured in the exhibition Rights for Women: London's Pioneers in their Own Words staged at Senate House Library from 16 July to 15 December 2018.

In July 2019, she was awarded the inaugural Africa Writes Lifetime Achievement Award, presented to her at the British Library during the Royal African Society's annual literary weekend by Ade Solanke and Diane Abbott as part of the festival headline event celebrating Busby's anthology New Daughters of Africa."Africa Writes: Margaret Busby OBE awarded Lifetime Achievement in African Literature", Alt Africa Review, 12 July 2019.Adanech Tadesse, "A Life Transcending Borders: The Legacy of Margaret Busby OBE", Africa Writes.

Busby is frequently cited as a pioneer in the history of Black publishers in the UK,Satch Hoyt, "Margaret Busby: What it takes to be the first Black Woman Publisher in the UK – Part 2", Afro-Sonic Mapping, 9 July 1919. and is acknowledged as a "pathfinder" by those who followed in her footsteps working towards making the books industry and its output more diverse, among them Bibi Bakare-Yusuf (who when speaking of founding Cassava Republic Press said: "Inspirational figures in publishing such as Margaret Busby, co-founder of Allison & Busby, were our guide"), Ellah Wakatama Allfrey, Valerie Brandes of Jacaranda Books, Sharmaine Lovegrove of Dialogue Books, and Aki Schilz of The Literary Consultancy.

In UK Black History Month 2019, Zadie Smith said that Busby "has been a cheerleader, instigator, organiser, defender and celebrator of black arts for the past 50 years, shouting about us from the rooftops, even back when few people cared to listen. 'We can because she did' is a cliché but in Margaret's case it is both true and no exaggeration. She helped change the landscape of both UK publishing and arts coverage and so many Black British artists owe her a debt. I know I do." Afua Hirsch described Busby's impact on her career by saying that "as a black woman trying to find my own voice, [Margaret] has been endlessly interested, supportive and enthusiastic about helping a generation like me find our place and our ability to make change through writing."

Busby was named on the 2020 list of 100 Great Black Britons, voted on by the public and with a scope of 400 years."Officially 'Great'", The Booker Prizes, 2 October 2020.

In May 2021 she was announced as the recipient of the London Book Fair Lifetime Achievement Award 2021, which was presented to her by Bernardine Evaristo in September at The Hurlingham Club.Sian Bayley, "Margaret Busby receives LBF Lifetime Achievement Award", The Bookseller, 24 September 2021.

She was appointed Commander of the Order of the British Empire (CBE) in the 2021 Birthday Honours for services to publishing. She was quoted in the Hackney Gazette as saying: "Well, I know I did not fall from the sky; whenever I am offered any such award, my accepting it is also on behalf of and to acknowledge everyone who made me what I am, and those whom I have worked with along the way - so I gladly share this recognition with many others who deserve equally to be honoured for contributing excellence in countless spheres of work."

She has been awarded a number of honorary degrees including from the Open University, SOAS, and from Royal Holloway, the conferral taking place in June 2021 with the oration being given by Professor Lavinia Greenlaw. In June 2022, Busby also received an honorary doctorate from the University of Exeter.

Honours and awards
 1970: Society of Young Publishers Award. 
 1977: Featured in Mayotte Magnus exhibition Women, photographs of eminent British women, at London's National Portrait Gallery, reprised in 2018 as Illuminating Women."Judi! Edna! Glenda! Women who lit up the 70s – in pictures", The Guardian, 16 October 2018.
 1993: Pandora Award from Women in Publishing.
 1998: Honorary Member of Alpha Kappa Alpha (AKA) International Region.
 1999: Race in the Media Award for radio play Minty Alley.
 1999: Enstooled as Nana Akua Ackon, of Bentsir No. 1 Asafo company, Oguaa (Cape Coast) – the first of seven traditional warrior groups established to protect the area.Aida Edemariam, "Margaret Busby: how Britain's first black female publisher revolutionised literature – and never gave up", The Guardian, 22 October 2020.
 2004: Open University Honorary Doctorate for Services to the Arts and Sciences.
 2004: Featured in "A Great Day in London" photograph at the British Library among 50 Black and Asian writers who have made major contributions to British literature.Kevin Le Gendre, "Books: A great day for a family get together; Who are the movers and shakers in black British writing? And can they all fit on one staircase?", The Independent on Sunday, 17 October 2004.
 2006: Officer of the Order of the British Empire, for services to Literature and to Publishing."31st December, 2005, New Year Honours" , Government News.
 2011: Honorary Fellowship, Queen Mary, University of London.
 2015: Henry Swanzy Award for Distinguished Service to Caribbean Letters, NGC Bocas Lit Fest, Trinidad."Bocas Henry Swanzy Award for Distinguished Service to Caribbean Letters" , NGC Bocas Lit Fest.
 2015: UK African Heritage High Achievers Recognition Award from the House of Amau."Another Honour for Margaret Busby OBE", George Padmore Institute, 20 October 2015.
 2015: Honorary Membership of PAWA (Pan African Writers Association) Award, Ghana.
 2017: Elected Honorary Fellow of the Royal Society of Literature.
 2017: Awarded the Benson Medal by the Royal Society of Literature for lifelong achievement.
 2017: Goldsmiths University of London event "Daughter of Africa: Celebrating Margaret Busby's 50 Years in Publishing and Beyond".
 2018: Selected as one of University of London's 150 "Leading Women" to celebrate 150 years of women's higher education in the UK.
 2019: Inaugural Africa Writes Lifetime Achievement Award from the Royal African Society.
 2019: Honorary doctorate from SOAS, University of London.
 2020: Honorary degree from Royal Holloway, University of London.Emilio Costales, "Pioneering publisher Margaret Busby comes to Royal Holloway", Royal Holloway Enterprise Hub, 15 November 2019.
 2020: Voted one of "100 Great Black Britons".
 2021: London Book Fair Lifetime Achievement Award."Margaret Busby to receive The London Book Fair Lifetime Achievement Award 2021", Black History Month Magazine, 22 May 2021.
 2021: Commander of the Order of the British Empire, for services to publishing.Sian Bayley, "Busby and Page recognised in Queen's birthday honours list", The Bookseller, 11 June 2021.
 2022: Honorary degree (DLitt) from the University of Exeter.

See also
 Jessica Huntley
 John La Rose

References

Further reading
 Constantia Nicolaides, "Trailblazing Through Time: Publishers". National Portrait Gallery.
 Shola von Reinhold, "What happened to Britain's black avant-garde fiction writers?", Voices, The Independent, 12 May 2019.

Interviews and profiles
 Aida Edemariam, "Margaret Busby: how Britain's first black female publisher revolutionised literature – and never gave up", The Guardian, 22 October 2020.
 Sarah Ladipo Manyika, "On Meeting Margaret Busby", Granta, 19 October 2020.

 "Women's History Month: We Celebrate Margaret Busby OBE", The Voice, 31 March 2017.
 Shereen Ali, "Sharing our Voices", Trinidad and Tobago Guardian, 29 April 2015.
 John Stevenson, "Margaret Busby: Doyenne of Black British Publishing", Black History Month 365, 28 September 2016.
 Ellen Mitchell and Sophie Kulik, "Q&A: Margaret Busby on 'New Daughters of Africa, Africa In Words, 29 June 2019.
 Claire Shepherd, "Margaret Busby OBE – 'Africa Writes – Lifetime Achievement, Culturepulse Magazine (September Issue), 31 August 2019, pp. 9–14.  
 "The Margaret Busby Interview| A 'Daughter of Africa, Alt A Review, April 2019.
 Satch Hoyt, "Margaret Busby: What it takes to be the first Black Woman Publisher in the UK – Part 1", "Part 2", "Part 3", Afro-Sonic Mapping, 9 July 1919.
 "In Conversation with Margaret Busby", Literandra, 22 March 2020.
 "An Artist in Time: Margaret Busby", Baring Foundation, 17 November 2020.
 "Celebrating Margaret Busby", Book word'', 24 December 2020.
 "Margaret Busby: 'At school I could count in Farsi...". Margaret Busby in conversation with Burt Caesar, Writers Mosaic.

External links 
 "People of Letters | 2019", Museum of Colour, "Margaret Busby" (Photography by Sharron Wallace).
 The Margaret Busby papers, 1978–1989, related to her publication of books by and about C. L. R. James are held at Columbia University Libraries.

1944 births
20th-century British women writers
20th-century Ghanaian women writers
Alumni of Bedford College, London
Black British radio presenters
British publishers (people)
Black British women writers
British women journalists
British women dramatists and playwrights
Commanders of the Order of the British Empire
Ghanaian dramatists and playwrights
Ghanaian emigrants to England
Ghanaian women journalists
Ghanaian publishers (people)
Ghanaian women writers
Living people
Women anthologists
Women book publishers (people)
British women radio presenters
Ghanaian women radio presenters